Lagrange Township is one of nine townships in Bond County, Illinois, USA.  As of the 2020 census, its population was 1,103 and it contained 512 housing units.

Geography

Unincorporated towns
 Ayers
 Paisley Corners

Extinct settlements
 Elm Point

Cemeteries
The township contains these four cemeteries: Elm Point, Jett Number, Union Grove and Wright.

Major highways
  Illinois State Route 127

Lakes
 Governor Bond Lake

Demographics
As of the 2020 census there were 1,103 people, 434 households, and 357 families residing in the township. The racial makeup of the township was 93.93% White, 0.45% African American, 0.18% Native American, 0.18% Asian, 0.00% Pacific Islander, 0.18% from other races, and 5.08% from two or more races. Hispanic or Latino of any race were 1.81% of the population.

There were 434 households, out of which 19.60% had children under the age of 18 living with them, 78.57% were married couples living together, 3.69% had a female householder with no spouse present, and 17.74% were non-families. 12.90% of all households were made up of individuals, and 3.90% had someone living alone who was 65 years of age or older. The average household size was 2.42 and the average family size was 2.50.

The township's age distribution consisted of 12.6% under the age of 18, 6.7% from 18 to 24, 14% from 25 to 44, 39.7% from 45 to 64, and 27.0% who were 65 years of age or older. The median age was 54.9 years. For every 100 females, there were 122.9 males. For every 100 females age 18 and over, there were 110.8 males.

The median income for a household in the township was $86,250, and the median income for a family was $96,250. Males had a median income of $54,097 versus $30,833 for females. The per capita income for the township was $42,902. About 9.0% of families and 7.5% of the population were below the poverty line, including 20.7% of those under age 18 and 3.9% of those age 65 or over.

School districts
 Bond County Community Unit School District 2
 Hillsboro Community Unit School District 3
 Mulberry Grove Community Unit School District 1

Political districts
 Illinois' 19th congressional district
 State House District 102
 State Senate District 51

References
 
 United States Census Bureau 2007 TIGER/Line Shapefiles
 United States National Atlas

External links
 City-Data.com
 Illinois State Archives

Townships in Bond County, Illinois
Populated places established in 1888
1888 establishments in Illinois
Townships in Illinois